The Connecticut School of Broadcasting was founded in 1964 by Dick Robinson as a small, private school in Connecticut. Known now as the CSB Media Arts Center, it is the largest group of Digital Media Arts Schools (Broadcast Media School, Code School, Social Media Marketing School, and Film Schools) that trains students for careers in emerging technologies. 

The Web Developer Program prepares students for entry-level work as a Jr. Web Developer. Learn to code. The full stack course is taught by industry professionals, and the curriculum was chosen specifically to suit the needs of the local job market. Students learn to understand coding logic using PHP and JavaScript, web design using HTML, CSS, Bootstrap ,and relational databases using SQL.

The Social Media Marketing Specialist Program teaches students how to use social media as a tool to increase brand awareness, obtain leads, and increase sales.

The Digital Filmmaking Program trains students how to write, shoot, direct, and edit their own short, character-driven comedy, drama, or horror short films. Students can also have the option of creating a television pilot. Students will shoot on HD cameras, learn industry standard lighting techniques, and edit on Adobe Premiere Pro. Students train in small group classes and are taught by industry professionals. The training program has four main components: screen-writing, pre-production, production, and post-production.  The CSB Media Arts Center has five campuses in CT, NJ, NC, and FL of the United States. Not all campuses offer the same programs.

Overview
Founded in 1964 by Dick Robinson as a small, private school in Connecticut, CSB now has 5 campuses along the east coast. It has evolved to become the CSB Media Arts Center offering programs in Broadcast Media (Broadcast Media School), Web Development (Code School), Social Media Marketing (Social Media Marketing School), Digital Filmmaking (Film School), Mobile Application Design and Development. CSB Media Arts Center is the nation's largest group of Digital Media Arts Schools.

Instructional methods 
Day and evening classes are offered. Classes are taught by industry professionals who work in the business and become network sources for students and grads. CSB Media Arts Center uses a seasonal semester schedule, providing 8-week day and 16-week evening classes in March, July and November. The Charlotte campus has an extended curriculum lasting eight months. All schools teach in either a hybrid model (Broadcast Media Program and Digital Filmmaking) where a portion of the program is taught online and hands-on training happens on-site at the campus studios. Some programs are offered 100% online.  Inquire within your local campus. Most Schools are VA Approved and our FL Campus is a partner with Career Source Broward, and Career Source Palm Beach County

Facilities
CSB Media Arts Center has multiple campuses in the continental United States, primarily in larger cities, offering its students and alumni, in good standing, use of their equipment and labs/studios, for the life of the school. Programs are offered in the following cities:
 Farmington, Connecticut [Hartford area]
 Stratford, Connecticut [Bridgeport–New Haven area]
 Cherry Hill, New Jersey [Philadelphia area]
 Charlotte, North Carolina
 Palm Beach, Florida [West Palm Beach area]

References

External links
 

Broadcasting schools
Education companies of the United States
Education companies established in 1964
Educational institutions established in 1964
Farmington, Connecticut
Organizations based in Connecticut
Private universities and colleges in Florida
Private universities and colleges in Georgia (U.S. state)
Universities and colleges in Charlotte, North Carolina
1964 establishments in Connecticut
Universities and colleges in Middlesex County, Massachusetts
Universities and colleges in Hartford County, Connecticut
Universities and colleges in Fairfield County, Connecticut
Universities and colleges in Nassau County, New York
Universities and colleges in Bergen County, New Jersey
Universities and colleges in Camden County, New Jersey
Universities and colleges in Palm Beach County, Florida
Universities and colleges in Broward County, Florida
Private universities and colleges in Connecticut
Film schools in the United States
Digital media schools
Podcasting companies